Severozapaden (Northwest Planning Region), is a region of Bulgaria. The capital is the city of Pleven. The region has the lowest-ranked economy in Bulgaria and the European Union, with a GDP per capita (PPS) of €9,300 or 31% of EU28 average (2017). It includes five administrative divisions or oblasts: Vidin Province, Vratsa Province, Montana Province, Lovech Province and Pleven Province. 

According to Eurostat, Severozapaden is the poorest region in the EU.
It is also ranked as one of the European regions with the lowest life expectancy since Bulgarians from the region of Severozapaden are predicted to live just past their 73rd birthday.

See also 
 NUTS of Bulgaria

References

Regions of Bulgaria